Kut-e Navaser (also Romanized as Kūt-e Navāşer and Kūt on Navāşer) was a village in Kut-e Abdollah Rural District, in the Central District of Karun County, Khuzestan Province, Iran. At the 2006 census, its population was 5,217, in 921 families. The village was merged with 8 other into one city called Kut-e Abdollah.

References 

Former populated places in Karun County